NIRA Intense Import Drag Racing is a drag racing simulation video game developed and published by Bethesda Softworks.

Reception

IGN rated the game a 7 of 10 saying "Overall, the game designers did a good job with NIRA Intense Import Drag Racing. I didn't like it quite as much as Burnout: Championship Drag Racing, but it was fun and it did keep me coming back for more, at least for a while. The only big problem with the game is the graphics and sound aren't up to par with other modern racers, and that it's a niche title that appeals to hardcore drag racing fans and may alienate the average gamer who's just looking for some quick fun. Intense Import does have a high learning curve, so expect to spend some time exploring all of the aspects of the game. But if you do have the patience for it, you'll be rewarded with a drag racing game that's surprisingly fun and entertaining."

Stephen Poole of GameSpot rated the game a 6.4 of 10 saying "However, it turns out that NIRA Intense Import Drag Racing is little more than an add-on pack for Hot Rod Championship Drag Racing designed to run as a stand-alone product. I'm thankful that Bethesda at least kept the sticker price low ($19.95), but the bottom line is that everything that had kept Hot Rod from introducing drag racing to the gaming masses is still alive and kicking in this latest incarnation".

References

Bethesda Softworks games
1999 video games
XnGine games
Racing video games
Video games developed in the United States
Windows games
Windows-only games